Agrabad may also refer to:

Places
 Agrabad, a downtown commercial and financial district in Chittagong, Bangladesh

Roads
 Agrabad Access Road

Institutes
 Agrabad Balika Bidyalay, a private girls school located at Agrabad, Chittagong
 Agrabad Government Colony High School, a high school located in south Agrabad, Chittagong
 Agrabad Mohila College, a private women's degree college in Double Mooring Thana, Chittagong